Estadio Baltasar Pujales is a football stadium in Bouzas, Vigo, Spain, that hosts the home matches of Rapido de Bouzas. It can hold up to 2500 people. The stadium was renovated in 2009.

External links
Club & stadium history Estadios de España  

Football venues in Galicia (Spain)
Buildings and structures in the Province of Pontevedra
Sports venues completed in 2001
2001 establishments in Spain